Hortlax is a locality situated in Piteå Municipality, Norrbotten County, Sweden with 1,248 inhabitants in 2010.

References

External links

Populated places in Piteå Municipality
Norrbotten